Raymond "Ray" Martin (born 7 February 1960) is an Australian sprint canoeist. He participated in the K-4 1000 m event at the 1984 Summer Olympics, finishing in 7th place in the final.

Education career
Martin was the assistant principal of De La Salle College, Kingsgrove, between 1997 and 1998, and Trinity Catholic College, Auburn/Regents Park, between 2002 and 2007. He was the principal of Holy Spirit Catholic College, Lakemba, between 2008 and 2015, and Marist Catholic College Penshurst, between 2016 and 2022.

He is currently the foundation principal of St Vincent's College in Ashfield, which was formed as a result of the amalgamation of De La Salle College Ashfield, Bethlehem College and St Vincent's Primary School in 2023.

See also
 Canoeing at the 1984 Summer Olympics

References

External links
Raymond Martin at the Australian Olympic Committee (AOC) website

1960 births
Australian male canoeists
Canoeists at the 1984 Summer Olympics
Living people
Olympic canoeists of Australia
20th-century Australian people